The 2016 PSA Women's World Series Finals is the women's edition of the 2016 PSA World Series Finals (Prize money : $160 000). The top 8 players in the 2015–16 PSA World Series are qualified for the event. The event will take place in Dubai in the United Arab Emirates from 24 to 28 May 2016.

Seeds

Group stage results

Pool A

Pool B

Draw and results

See also
2016 Men's PSA World Series Finals
PSA World Series 2015–16
PSA World Series Finals
PSA World Tour 2015
PSA World Tour 2016

References

External links
PSA World Series website
World Series Final official website

W
PSA World Tour
2016 in women's squash